The Testing of Luther Albright is the debut novel of MacKenzie Scott, published in 2005 by Fourth Estate, an imprint of HarperCollins.

Plot 
Luther Albright is a devoted father and a designer of dams, a self-controlled man who believes he can engineer happiness for his family by sheltering them from his own emotions. But when an earthquake shakes his Sacramento home, the world Luther has constructed with such care begins to tilt: his son's behavior becomes increasingly bizarre and threatening, his loving wife seems to grow distant, the house he built with his own hands shows its first signs of decay, and a dam of his design comes under investigation for structural flaws exposed by the tremors.

Reception 
The book received a generally positive reception, with reviews also criticizing the confusing and uncompelling narrator. The book was widely reviewed, garnering reviews from The New York Times, Publishers Weekly, New Orleans Review, The A.V. Club, Kirkus Reviews, The Independent, and The Seattle Times, among others. The book won a 2006 American Book Award.

References

External links 

 Bezos discusses her debut novel, Seattle Post-Intelligencer
 The Testing of Luther Albright at Goodreads

2005 American novels
2005 debut novels
Fourth Estate books